Dina Abdrachimova (1934-2002) was a Soviet-Kazakhstani politician (Communist).

She served as Minister of Social Security in 1985–1990.

References

1934 births
20th-century Kazakhstani women politicians
20th-century Kazakhstani politicians
Soviet women in politics
Kazakhstani communists
Women government ministers of Kazakhstan
2002 deaths